The  is a compact organization of photographers founded in 1924 that has continued to this day.

Founded in 1924, its first president was Shinzō Fukuhara, and its other founding members included the amateur photographers Rosō Fukuhara, Kiichirō Ishida, Isao Kakefuda, Maroni Kumazawa, Yasutarō Mori, Masajirō Sakai, Hekisui Yamanaka, and Jiichirō Yasukōchi. Among the members who joined soon after was Yasuzō Nojima, in 1926.

From 1925, the JPS has held a joint exhibition once a year. 

The JPS was suspended in 1944, but restarted in 1946.

Members 
 Rosō Fukuhara
 Shinzō Fukuhara
 Kiyoshi Nishiyama
 Akira Toriyama

Notes

Sources and further reading
Iizawa Kōtarō. “In Search of the Poetry of Life: The Photographic World of Shinzo Fukuhara.” Pp. 117–25. In Hikari no shijō: Fukuhara Shinzō no sekai (光の詩情：福原信三の世界) / The World of Shinzo Fukuhara: Poetics of Light. Tokyo: Shiseido Corporate Culture Department, 1994.  A translation of the Japanese-language text, which appears on pp. 15–24 of this bilingual exhibition catalogue.
Matsuda Takako. “Major Photography Clubs and Associations.” In Anne Wilkes Tucker, et al. The History of Japanese Photography. New Haven: Yale University Press, 2003. . Pp. 373.
 Nihon shashinka jiten (日本写真家事典) / 328 Outstanding Japanese Photographers. Kyoto: Tankōsha, 2000. P. 347. . Despite its alternative title in English, the text is all in Japanese.

External links
 JPS 
 JPS history  

1924 establishments in Japan
Japanese photography organizations
Arts organizations established in 1924